Salman Kandi ( is a village in Shaban Rural District of Qosabeh District, Meshgin Shahr County, Ardabil province, Iran. At the 2006 census, its population was 552 in 118 households, at which time the village was in the Central District. The following census in 2011 counted 424 people in 120 households. The latest census in 2016 showed a population of 409 people in 133 households; it was the largest village in its rural district, now in Qosabeh District.

References 

Meshgin Shahr County

Towns and villages in Meshgin Shahr County

Populated places in Ardabil Province

Populated places in Meshgin Shahr County

fa:دوشانلو